Guillermo García López was the defending champion but chose not to defend his title.

Thiemo de Bakker won the title after defeating Yannick Maden 6–2, 6–1 in the final.

Seeds

Draw

Finals

Top half

Bottom half

References
Main Draw
Qualifying Draw

The Hague Open - Singles
2018 Singles